The 2008 bird flu outbreak in West Bengal is an occurrence of avian influenza in West Bengal, India that began on January 16, 2008. The infection was caused by the H5N1 subtype of the Influenza A virus and occurred in at least thirteen districts, including Birbhum, Nadia, Murshidabad, Burdwan, Hooghly, Cooch Behar, Malda, Bankura, Purulia, Howrah, West Midnapore, South 24 Parganas  and South Dinajpur and several new inclusion are reported daily. A range of precautions has been instituted including a large cull of chickens, eggs, and poultry birds, the imposition of segregation zones, and a disinfection programme for the plant. The government had put a blanket ban on the movement of poultry birds from West Bengal.


Causes
Immediate causes are not determined, but a high poultry density followed by a moist cold climate had led to the quick spread of the virus. With the highest population density in India, West Bengal had a high risk of the deadly virus spreading to humans.
As per other accounts, bird flu had spread to half of the state due to delayed action, bad planning and mismanagement by Government of West Bengal. In many villages, people led by ruling party leaders resisted culling operations.. Agriculture Minister Sharad Pawar had slammed the Communist Party of India (Marxist) government for not reporting the bird flu epidemic early on. Shortage of staff for culling operation is one of the other reasons.

Spread
At least eleven districts of West Bengal, including Birbhum, Nadia, Murshidabad, Burdwan, Hooghly, Cooch Behar, Malda, Bankura, Purulia, Howrah, West Midnapore, South 24 Parganas and South Dinajpur were affected by bird flu.

References

Disease outbreaks in India
Influenza pandemics
2008 disease outbreaks
Avian influenza
2000s in West Bengal
Disasters in West Bengal
2008 in India
Health in West Bengal
21st-century epidemics
Epidemics in India
Manmohan Singh administration